Joshua Evans Jr. (January 20, 1777 – October 2, 1846) was a Jacksonian member of the U.S. House of Representatives from Pennsylvania.

Joshua Evans was born in Paoli, Pennsylvania.  He was a hotel keeper and also engaged in agricultural pursuits.  He married Lydia Davis 29 February 1808. He served as a member of the Pennsylvania House of Representatives in 1820.  He was appointed the first postmaster of Paoli on December 9, 1826, and served until February 13, 1830.  He was the president of the Tredyffrin Township, Pennsylvania, school board from 1836 to 1846.  He served as brigadier general of the State militia.

Evans was elected as a Jacksonian to the Twenty-first and Twenty-second Congresses.  He was not a candidate for renomination in 1832.  He resumed his former business pursuits and died in Paoli in 1846.  Interment in the cemetery of the Great Valley Baptist Church in New Centerville, Pennsylvania.

Sources

The Political Graveyard

External links

1777 births
1846 deaths
People from Chester County, Pennsylvania
American people of Welsh descent
Pennsylvania Jacksonians
19th-century American politicians
Members of the United States House of Representatives from Pennsylvania
Members of the Pennsylvania House of Representatives
Pennsylvania postmasters
People from Paoli, Pennsylvania